Olive skin is a human skin colour spectrum. It is often associated with pigmentation in the Type III to Type IV and Type V ranges of the Fitzpatrick scale. It generally refers to moderate or lighter tan skin, and it is often described as having yellow, green, or golden undertones.

People with olive skin can sometimes become paler if their sun exposure is limited. However, lighter olive skin still tans more easily than light skin does, and generally still retains notable yellow or greenish undertones.

Geographic distribution
Type III pigmentation is frequent among populations from the Mediterranean (i.e. Southern Europe, Western Asia, and Northern Africa) as well as some parts of Latin America and Asia. It ranges from cream to darker olive skin tones. This skin type sometimes burns and tans gradually, but always tans.

Type IV pigmentation is frequent among some populations from the Mediterranean, Romani people, as well as parts of Asia and Latin America. It ranges from brownish or darker olive to moderate brown, typical Mediterranean skin tones. This skin type rarely burns and tans easily.

Type V pigmentation is frequent among populations from the Middle East, parts of the Mediterranean and Southern Europe, Romani people, parts of Africa, Latin America, and the South Asian subcontinent. It ranges from olive to tan, Middle Eastern skin tones. This skin type very rarely burns and tans quite easily.

See also
 Bronze (racial classification)
 Brown (racial classification)
 Human skin color
 Mediterranean race

References

Mediterranean
Skin pigmentation